Margaret of Scotland may refer to:

Nobility
 Saint Margaret of Scotland (1045–1093), Queen consort of Malcolm III
 Margaret of Scotland, Countess of Kent (1193-1259), who married Hubert de Burgh, Earl of Kent
 Lady Margaret of Huntingdon (died before 1228), daughter of David, Earl of Huntingdon, married Alan of Galloway
 Margaret of England (1240–1275), Queen consort of Alexander III
 Margaret of Scotland, Queen of Norway (1261–1283), daughter of Alexander III of Scotland and Margaret of England, married Eric II of Norway
 Margaret, Maid of Norway (1283–1290), Norwegian–Scottish princess, Queen of Scots
 Margaret Drummond, Queen of Scotland (1340–1375), Queen consort of David II
 Margaret Stewart, Dauphine of France (1424–1445), daughter of James I of Scotland and Joan Beaufort, married the future Louis XI of France
 Princess Margaret Stewart of Scotland (b.c.1455), daughter of James II of Scotland
 Margaret of Denmark (1456–1486), Queen consort of James III
 Margaret Tudor (1489–1541), Queen consort of James IV
 Princess Margaret of Scotland (1598–1600), daughter of James VI and I

See also
Margaret of Huntingdon (disambiguation)